Yamba's Playtime is an Australian children's preschool television program, produced and broadcast by Imparja Television from 1995 and since 2010 has also been broadcast by Nine Network Australia. Each 30 minute episode of Yamba's Playtime follows the life of Yamba the Yerrampe (or honey ant) and is the first indigenous themed preschool program to have received a "P" Classification.

Yamba the Honeyant is from Central Australia, and has a best friend named Jacinta.  
Yamba is very curious and loves to learn, is active and energetic, friendly and outgoing.  Other characters on the show include Grandpa and Grandma Honeyant, Cecilina the Ballerina (Yamba's big sister) and Miss Honeypot (Cecilina's ballet teacher).

Every episode of Yamba's Playtime is educational yet entertaining and reflects distinctive qualities that can only be found in the red centre of Australia. It appeals to an indigenous and non-indigenous preschool audience as proven by the high rating of viewers who tuned into Series 1 in January 2012.

"What I love about Yamba’s Playtime, is that while it is primarily aimed at a young indigenous audience, with its energy, music, and sense of story fun it actually appeals to a much broader demographic.  It’s enlightening on so many levels," said Cameron Clarke, former screenwriter of Hi 5.

Because of the massively popular preschool program, it was decided to use Yamba as a vehicle to present healthy messages to remote towns and communities.  Yamba's Roadshow was created and in 2011 the Yamba Roadshow crew began travelling throughout the Northern Territory and continued into Queensland performing stage shows all about healthy living.

During the roadshows, Yamba is waved at in the streets, mobbed by fans, and treated like a celebrity. Before the performances, Yamba's name is always chanted over and over, in anticipation of the Honeyant Rockstar coming onto the stage.

Characters

Yamba the Yerrampe
Yamba is a honey ant from Central Australia, and is played by a person in a honey ant suit. According to the Imparja website, Yamba is energetic, friendly, and loves to learn.

Jacinta
Jacinta is Yamba's best friend. She is human, and is played by Jacinta Price.

Chabba and Flopp
Chabba and Flopp are two imaginary socks created by Robbie.

Cecilina the Ballerina
Cecilina the Ballerina is Yamba's big sister. She loves ballet, fruit salad and visiting Yamba and Jacinta

Grandma & Grandpa Honeyant
Grandpa Honeyant is Yamba and Cecilina's grandfather. In Series 1 & 2 he has a segment called 'Grandpa Honeyant's Storytime'. Grandma Honeyant is Yamba and Cecilina's grandmother; she is a wise woman and loves her grandchildren.

Miss Honeypot
Miss Honeypot is Cecilina's Ballet Teacher.

Episodes
.

Series 1
Series 1 was first aired in January 2012 on the Nine Network and Imparja Television. It will be aired again late 2012 on both networks.

PGM1	3 Wishes
Yamba the Honeyant finds a magic lamp and makes three ANTastic wishes.

PGM2	The Holiday
Yamba takes best friend Jacinta on a holiday to an imaginary place called Yambaland.

PGM3	Superheroes
Yamba the Superant's X-Ray vision glasses are lost and Jacinta helps to find them.

PGM4	 Robots
Yamba the Honeyant wants to be like the clown robot, Robbo the Robot, but Jacinta soon grows tired of all the jokes.

PGM5 It's Hot Today
Yamba wants to play outside but it's too hot so best friend Jacinta shows Yamba many ways to keep cool.

PGM6 Magical Day
Cecilina, Yamba's big sister, has disappeared and Yamba thinks a magic trick has made her disappear.  Did Yamba make Cecilina disappear or make two Cecilinas reappear!

PGM7	The Treasure Map
Grandpa Honeyant gave Yamba a map and Yamba and Jacinta think it's a treasure map.  They have an antastic time trying to follow the directions.

PGM8	Communication
Yamba has to send Cecilina a message quickly so Jacinta helps Yamba find ways to send a message.

PGM9 Wheels Go Round
Jacinta helps Yamba try to find the right shape that fits a wheel on the toy train.

PGM10 Birthday Party
It's Grandma Honeyant's birthday and Yamba comes up with a theme for a party but not everyone assumes it's the same theme as what Yamba has planned.

PGM11 Yamba Gets a Pet
Yamba has had an antastic dream about owning a pet.  Jacinta enjoys Yamba telling her all about the dream.

PGM12 The Desert
Yamba has to sing a song about the desert for preschool so Jacinta helps Yamba to write the song.

PGM13 A Home
Yamba is very cold so Jacinta shows how different homes keep animals warm by building them in the Playroom.

PGM14 Sports Day
Yamba has been to a Preschool Sports Day and enjoyed being in various races.  But how did Yamba's head get a big bandage around it?

Holiday Specials
These episodes have been aired on the Nine Network and Imparja Television for the holiday.

Yamba's Easter Adventure
Enjoy an Easter holiday adventure with Yamba the Honeyant and Jacinta as they journey to Yambaland.

Yamba's Christmas Surprise
Come on a fun, engaging and entertaining journey with Yamba the Honey Ant and discover what Yamba's Christmas surprise really is.

Notes

Imparja Television original programming
Nine Network original programming
9Go! original programming
National Indigenous Television original programming
Australian children's television series
Australian television shows featuring puppetry
1995 Australian television series debuts
2000s Australian television series
2010s Australian television series
Australian preschool education television series
Television shows set in the Northern Territory
English-language television shows